Soraya Ray L. Bañas (born 23 September 1987), better known as Kitkat, is a singer, comedian, TV Host, and actress in the Philippines. She is known as "The Stolen Diva", under the management of Star Magic. She is a stand-up singer/comedian at The Punchline, Laffline and Metro Comedy Bar. Her first solo concert was in January 2009 at the Metro Bar. Kitkat portrays sidekicks in television series and movies. She has appeared on the game show The Singing Bee.

Early life
Kitkat was born on 23 September 1987 in Manila Philippines. When she was seven years old, she was a grandfinalist at the kids beauty contest in GMA 7's Lunch Date and she was hailed 5 weeks Champion of Tanghalan ng Kampeon, hosted by Pilita Corrales and Bert Tawa Marcelo. She was also part of the children show Yan ang Bata during childhood. She entered amateur singing contests in different cities and a television singing contest while still a child, and while at school in college, she worked as a back-up singer then band member with Willie Revillame. Then became a singer stand-up comedienne in Punchline, Laffline and Metro Bar and discovered to be an actress/comedienne in the afternoon teleserye Maid in Heaven. She holds a degree in Bachelor of Arts-International Studies from the College of the Holy Spirit, graduating in 2004.

Current career
After the closing of ABS-CBN 2 last 5 May 2020 due to not having a renewal franchise of the TV network, KitKat Hosted the Net 25 Noontime Show following her leaving Starmagic. She hosted the daily noontime variety program titled Happy Time with fellow veteran comedian and former Eat Bulaga Dabarkads hosts Anjo Yllana and Janno Gibbs. Happy Time started airing on 14 September 2020 with the time slot of 12 pm to 2 pm.

Filmography

Television

Film

Awards and nominations

References

External links
 

1984 births
Living people
Filipino film actresses
Filipino Internet celebrities
Filipino television actresses
Filipino radio personalities
Filipino television personalities
Filipino women comedians
Actresses from Manila
Star Magic
ABS-CBN personalities
TV5 (Philippine TV network) personalities
GMA Network personalities
Filipino television variety show hosts